Weckt die Toten! ("Wake the Dead!") is the debut album by the German folk metal band In Extremo. It was released on 1 May 1998 through Vielklang Musikproduktion.

Reception 
In 2005, Weckt die Toten! was ranked number 391 in Rock Hard magazine's book of The 500 Greatest Rock & Metal Albums of All Time.

Track listing

Personnel 
 Das Letzte Einhorn – vocals, cittern
 Dr. Pymonte – German bagpipes, shawm
 Flex der Biegsame – German bagpipes, shawm
 Yellow Pfeiffer – German bagpipes, shawm
 Thomas der Münzer – guitar
 Morgenstern – drums
 Die Lutter – bass

References 

1998 albums
In Extremo albums
Metal Blade Records albums
Vertigo Records albums